Picnic Passage is a marine channel, 1.5 nautical miles (2.8 km) long and 0.5 nautical miles (0.9 km) wide, between Snow Hill Island and Seymour Island in the James Ross Island group. First surveyed in 1902 by Swedish Antarctic Expedition, 1901–04, under Otto Nordenskjold. The United Kingdom Antarctic Place-Names Committee (UK-APC) name arose from the excellent sledging conditions experienced during the Falkland Islands Dependencies Survey (FIDS) resurveying of the area of 1952, which gave to the work a picnic-like atmosphere.

References 

Straits of Graham Land
Landforms of the James Ross Island group